Tocache Airport  is an airport serving the town of Tocache in the San Martín Region of Peru.

See also

Transport in Peru
List of airports in Peru

References

External links
OpenStreetMap - Tocache
OurAirports - Tocache
SkyVector - Tocache

Airports in Peru
Buildings and structures in San Martín Region